is a railway station in the city of Sano, Tochigi, Japan, operated by the private railway operator Tōbu Railway. The station is numbered "TI-35".

Lines

Station layout
Yoshimizu Station has one island platform, connected to the station building by an overhead passageway.

Platforms

Adjacent stations

History
Yoshimizu Station opened on 23 June 1889. It was relocated 2.1 km from its original position in the direction of Sano Station on 1 February 1915.

From 17 March 2012, station numbering was introduced on all Tōbu lines, with Yoshimizu Station becoming "TI-36".

Passenger statistics
In fiscal 2019, the station was used by an average of 994 passengers daily (boarding passengers only).

Surrounding area
 Tanuma-Yoshimizu Post Office

See also
 List of railway stations in Japan

References

External links

 Tobu station information 
	

Railway stations in Japan opened in 1889
Tobu Sano Line
Stations of Tobu Railway
Railway stations in Tochigi Prefecture
Railway stations in Japan opened in 1915
Sano, Tochigi